Qumux is a village and municipality in the Shaki Rayon of Azerbaijan. It has a population of 965.

References

Populated places in Shaki District